Al-Shawka al-Tahta was a Palestinian Arab village in the Safad Subdistrict. It was depopulated during the 1947–1948 Civil War in Mandatory Palestine on May 14, 1948, by the Palmach's First Battalion of Operation Yiftach. It was located 31.5 km northeast of Safad.

History
The village contained two khirbas known as Tall al-Qadi and Khirbat al-Day'a.

In 1881 the Survey of Western Palestine identified  Khirbet Dufnah, meaning "the ruin of Daphne (oleander)", which they marked on their map in the place where Al-Shawka al-Tahta was to stand later, about 1km NNW of present-day Dafna.

British Mandate era
In the 1931 census of Palestine, during the  British Mandate for Palestine,  the village had a population of 136, all Muslims, in a total of 31 houses.

In the 1945 statistics it had a population of 200 Muslims  with a total land area of  2,132  dunams. Of this,  1,845  dunams were allocated for plantations and irrigable land, 140  for cereals, while 17 dunams were classified as non-cultivable areas.

References

Bibliography

External links
Welcome To al-Shawka al-Tahta
al-Shawka al-Tahta, Zochrot
al-Shawka al-Tahta
Survey of Western Palestine, Map 2:   IAA, Wikimedia commons

Arab villages depopulated during the 1948 Arab–Israeli War
District of Safad